Defending champion Steffi Graf defeated Martina Navratilova in the final, 3–6, 7–5, 6–1 to win the women's singles tennis title at the 1989 US Open. It was her second US Open title.

This marked the final professional appearance for former world No. 1 and 18-time major champion Chris Evert. She lost to Zina Garrison in the quarterfinals. It was Evert's 54th quarterfinal at a major (in her 56th major played), an Open Era record. She reached the quarterfinals in all 19 US Opens she entered, 17 times reaching the semifinals or better, and winning the title six times.

Seeds
The seeded players are listed below. Steffi Graf is the champion; others show the round in which they were eliminated.

  Steffi Graf (champion)
  Martina Navratilova (runner-up)
  Gabriela Sabatini (semifinalist)
  Chris Evert (quarterfinalist)
  Zina Garrison (semifinalist)
  Arantxa Sánchez Vicario (quarterfinalist)
  Manuela Maleeva (quarterfinalist)
  Helena Suková (quarterfinalist)
  Pam Shriver (first round)
  Mary Joe Fernández (first round)
  Jana Novotná (second round)
  Monica Seles (fourth round)
  Natalia Zvereva (fourth round)
  Katerina Maleeva (second round)
  Conchita Martínez (fourth round)
  Hana Mandlíková (third round)

Qualifying

Draw

Finals

Top half

Section 1

Section 2

Section 3

Section 4

Bottom half

Section 5

Section 6

Section 7

Section 8

Match summaries

Final

Semi-finals

Early rounds
 Sept 3, 1989 – Chris Evert defeats a 15-year-old Monica Seles for her 101st and last U.S. Open singles victory.
 Sept 5, 1989 – Chris Evert is defeated by Zina Garrison in Evert's last U.S. Open match.

References

External links
1989 US Open – Women's draws and results at the International Tennis Federation

Women's Singles
US Open (tennis) by year – Women's singles
1989 in women's tennis
1989 in American women's sports